Eucalyptus grisea, commonly known as grey gum, is a species of tree that is endemic to central Queensland. It has smooth greyish bark, lance-shaped to egg-shaped adult leaves, flower buds in groups of seven, white flower and usually cup-shaped fruit.

Description

Taxonomy and naming
Eucalyptus grisea was first formally described in 2000 by Ken Hill and Lawrie Johnson, and the description was published in the journal Telopea. The specific epithet grisea is from the late Latin, griseus, meaning "grey", referring to the colour of the bark.

Distribution and habitat
Grey gum grows in woodland and open forest and occurs in the Carnarvon Range in central Queensland.

Conservation status
This eucalypt is classified as "least concern" under the Queensland Government Nature Conservation Act 1992.

See also

List of Eucalyptus species

References

Trees of Australia
grisea
Myrtales of Australia
Flora of Queensland
Plants described in 2000
Taxa named by Lawrence Alexander Sidney Johnson
Taxa named by Ken Hill (botanist)